Richard Marsh may refer to:

 Richard Marsh (bishop) (died 1226), Lord Chancellor of England and Bishop of Durham
 Richard Marsh (horseman) (1851–1933), British racehorse trainer
 Richard Marsh (author) (1857–1915), pseudonym of author Richard Heldman
 Richard Marsh, Baron Marsh (1928–2011), Labour cabinet minister and chairman of British Rail
 Richard Marsh (racing driver), British Touring Car Championship racer
 Richard Marsh (rugby league) (born 1962), rugby league footballer of the 1980s
 Richard Marsh (1937–2009), birth name of American musician Sky Saxon
Richard Oglesby Marsh (1883-1953), an American engineer, explorer, diplomat, and ethnologist.